The Plumbing and Pipe Trades Employees Union is a trade union in Australia. It is a division of the Communications, Electrical and Plumbing Union of Australia. The union was originally formed through the amalgamation of state-based unions in Victoria, South Australia and Queensland in 1911. The federal union was initially known as the Australian Plumbers and Gasfitters Employees Union. The union amalgamated with the Electrical Trades Union of Australia and the Communication Workers Union of Australia in the 1990s to form the Communication, Electrical and Plumbing Union of Australia.

References

External links

  official site.

Trade unions in Australia
Trade unions established in 1911
1911 establishments in Australia
Building and construction trade unions